Moshe Onana is a former Israeli footballer and manager.
He is most famous for playing 15 years for Maccabi Jaffa, where he is considered to be an icon.

Honours
Liga Leumit (top division):
Runner-up (1): 1976–77
Liga Alef/Liga Artzit (second tier):
Winner (2): 1970–71, 1984–85

References

1950 births
Living people
Israeli Jews
Israeli footballers
Maccabi Jaffa F.C. players
Bnei Yehuda Tel Aviv F.C. players
Hakoah Maccabi Ramat Gan F.C. players
Israeli people of Bulgarian-Jewish descent
Footballers from Jerusalem
Asian Games silver medalists for Israel
Asian Games medalists in football
Association football forwards
Footballers at the 1974 Asian Games
Medalists at the 1974 Asian Games
Israel international footballers